Charles Hermite FRS FRSE MIAS (24 December 1822 – 14 January 1901) was a French mathematician who did research concerning number theory, quadratic forms, invariant theory, orthogonal polynomials, elliptic functions, and algebra.

Hermite polynomials, Hermite interpolation, Hermite normal form, Hermitian operators, and cubic Hermite splines are named in his honor.  One of his students was Henri Poincaré.

He was the first to prove that e, the base of natural logarithms, is a transcendental number.  His methods were used later by Ferdinand von Lindemann to prove that π is transcendental.

Life
Hermite was born in Dieuze, Moselle, on 24 December 1822, with a deformity in his right foot that would impair his gait throughout his life. He was the sixth of seven children of Ferdinand Hermite and his wife, Madeleine née Lallemand. Ferdinand worked in the drapery business of Madeleine's family while also pursuing a career as an artist. The drapery business relocated to Nancy in 1828, and so did the family.

Hermite obtained his secondary education at Collège de Nancy and then, in Paris, at Collège Henri IV and at the Lycée Louis-le-Grand. He read some of Joseph-Louis Lagrange's writings on the solution of numerical equations and Carl Friedrich Gauss's publications on number theory.

Hermite wanted to take his higher education at École Polytechnique, a military academy renowned for excellence in mathematics, science, and engineering. Tutored by mathematician Eugène Charles Catalan, Hermite devoted a year to preparing for the notoriously difficult entrance examination. In 1842 he was admitted to the school. However, after one year the school would not allow Hermite to continue his studies there because of his deformed foot. He struggled to regain his admission to the school, but the administration imposed strict conditions. Hermite did not accept this, and he quit the École Polytechnique without graduating.

In 1842, Nouvelles Annales de Mathématiques published Hermite's first original contribution to mathematics, a simple proof of Niels Abel's proposition concerning the impossibility of an algebraic solution to equations of the fifth degree.

A correspondence with Carl Jacobi, begun in 1843 and continued the next year, resulted in the insertion, in the complete edition of Jacobi's works, of two articles by Hermite, one concerning the extension to Abelian functions of one of the theorems of Abel on elliptic functions, and the other concerning the transformation of elliptic functions.

After spending five years working privately towards his degree, in which he befriended eminent mathematicians Joseph Bertrand, Carl Gustav Jacob Jacobi, and Joseph Liouville, he took and passed the examinations for the baccalauréat, which he was awarded in 1847. He married Joseph Bertrand's sister, Louise Bertrand, in 1848.

In 1848, Hermite returned to the École Polytechnique as répétiteur and examinateur d'admission. In 1856 he contracted smallpox. Through the influence of Augustin-Louis Cauchy and of a nun who nursed him, he resumed the practice of his Catholic faith. In July 1848, he was elected to the French Academy of Sciences. In 1869, he succeeded Jean-Marie Duhamel as professor of mathematics, both at the École Polytechnique, where he remained until 1876, and at the University of Paris, where he remained until his death. From 1862 to 1873 he was lecturer at the École Normale Supérieure. Upon his 70th birthday, he was promoted to grand officer in the French Legion of Honour.

Hermite died in Paris on 14 January 1901, aged 78.

Contribution to mathematics
An inspiring teacher, Hermite strove to cultivate admiration for simple beauty and discourage rigorous minutiae. His correspondence with Thomas Stieltjes testifies to the great aid he gave those beginning scientific life. His published courses of lectures have exercised a great influence. His important original contributions to pure mathematics, published in the major mathematical journals of the world, dealt chiefly with Abelian and elliptic functions and the theory of numbers.

In 1858, Hermite showed that equations of the fifth degree could be solved by elliptic functions. In 1873, he proved that e, the base of the natural system of logarithms, is transcendental. Techniques similar to those used in Hermite's proof of e transcendence were used by Ferdinand von Lindemann in 1882 to show that π is transcendental.

Publications
The following is a list of his works:
 "Sur quelques applications des fonctions elliptiques", Paris, 1855; Page images from Cornell.
 "Cours d'Analyse de l'École Polytechnique. Première Partie", Paris: Gauthier–Villars, 1873.
 "Cours professé à la Faculté des Sciences", edited by Andoyer, 4th ed., Paris, 1891; Page images from Cornell.
 "Correspondance", edited by Baillaud and Bourget, Paris, 1905, 2 vols.; PDF copy from UMDL.
 "Œuvres de Charles Hermite", edited by Picard for the Academy of Sciences, 4 vols., Paris: Gauthier–Villars, 1905, 1908, 1912 and 1917; PDF copy from UMDL.
 "Œuvres de Charles Hermite", reissued by Cambridge University Press, 2009; .

Quotations

Legacy
In addition to the mathematics properties named in his honor, the Hermite crater near the Moon's north pole is named after Hermite.

See also
List of things named after Charles Hermite
Hermitian manifold
Hermite interpolation
Hermite's cotangent identity
Hermite reciprocity
Ramanujan's constant

References

Sources

External links

 
  Cours d'Analyse de l'École Polytechnique (Première Partie) by Charles Hermite (DjVu file on Internet Archive)
  Œuvres de Charles Hermite (t1) edited by Émile Picard (DjVu file on Internet Archive)
  Œuvres de Charles Hermite (t2) edited by Émile Picard (DjVu file on Internet Archive)
  Œuvres de Charles Hermite (t3) edited by Émile Picard (DjVu file on Internet Archive)
  Œuvres de Charles Hermite (t4) edited by Émile Picard (DjVu file on Internet Archive)
This article incorporates text from the public-domain Catholic Encyclopedia of 1913.

 
 

1822 births
1901 deaths
People from Dieuze
Lycée Louis-le-Grand alumni
École Polytechnique alumni
Academic staff of École Polytechnique
19th-century French mathematicians
French Roman Catholics
Linear algebraists
Number theorists
Members of the French Academy of Sciences
Grand Officiers of the Légion d'honneur
Foreign Members of the Royal Society
Lycée Henri-IV alumni
Members of the Ligue de la patrie française
Commanders Grand Cross of the Order of the Polar Star
Recipients of the Pour le Mérite (civil class)